Jayson Stark (born July 19, 1951) is an American sportswriter and author who covers baseball for The Athletic. He is most known for his time with The Philadelphia Inquirer and ESPN.

Biography
Stark grew up in Northeast Philadelphia and graduated from Syracuse University's S. I. Newhouse School of Public Communications with a degree in journalism in 1973. In 1979 he joined The Philadelphia Inquirer as a beat writer for the Philadelphia Phillies, and eventually became a national baseball writer and columnist for that paper. From 1983 to 1999 he produced a nationally syndicated Baseball Week in Review column "known for unearthing obscure, historic and humorous aspects of baseball". He was twice named Pennsylvania Sportswriter of the Year by the National Sportscasters and Sportswriters Association. His observations and analysis of the 1993 Phillies team is quoted in several books.

Stark joined ESPN in 2000. He was a senior writer for ESPN.com. He also contributed to SportsCenter, ESPNews, Baseball Tonight, and a weekly segment during baseball season with WHB 810 in Kansas City. He appeared weekly on Mike & Mike. Beginning in 2014, Stark began co-hosting a weekly radio show during baseball season on ESPN Radio's affiliate in Philadelphia. Stark was inducted into the Philadelphia Jewish Sports Hall of Fame in 2017. Stark was laid off from ESPN on April 26, 2017, along with several other on-air personalities.  On April 1, 2018, he started writing for The Athletic.

Stark is the 2019 recipient of the J. G. Taylor Spink Award given by the Baseball Writers' Association of America, for "meritorious contributions to baseball writing".

Personal
Stark's wife Lisa is an assistant coach for the Council Rock North volleyball team. They have three children.

Bibliography

Books

Selected articles

"Schmidt Just Made It Look Easy", in The Phillies Reader, Richard Orodenker, ed. 2005: Temple University Press, page 220. .

References

External links
ESPN Jayson Stark Blog

 
Jayson Stark Live CBS Local
Stark on 'Cuse Conversations Podcast in 2020

Living people
1951 births
Writers from Philadelphia
Sportswriters from Pennsylvania
S.I. Newhouse School of Public Communications alumni
American television reporters and correspondents
Jewish American writers
The Philadelphia Inquirer people
20th-century American journalists
American male journalists
21st-century American journalists
20th-century American writers
21st-century American writers
BBWAA Career Excellence Award recipients
21st-century American Jews